Isaac Gálvez López (20 May 1975 in Vilanova i la Geltrú, Spain – 26 November 2006 in Ghent) was a Spanish track and road racing cyclist who rode for Caisse d'Epargne-Illes Balears in the UCI ProTour. He died during the Six Days of Ghent cycling event in Belgium after colliding with Dimitri De Fauw and crashing against the railing. He died from internal bleeding. At the time of the accident, he had only been married for three weeks.
After this, De Fauw suffered from depression and he committed suicide on 6 November 2009.

After the second stage of the 2007 edition of the Vuelta a Murcia was cancelled due to strong winds, the organisers dedicated the day's prizes to Gálvez in his memory. Gálvez's sister Débora Gálvez is also a racing cyclist.

Gálvez competed for Spain at the 2000 Summer Olympics.

Major results

1999
 1st  Madison (with Joan Llaneras), UCI Track World Championships
2000
 1st Clásica de Almería
2001
 1st Stage GP dos Mosqueteiros
 1st Stage Volta ao Alentejo
2002
 1st Trofeo Mallorca
2003
 1st Trofeo Mallorca
 1st Trofeo Alcudia
 1st Stage Setmana Catalana de Ciclisme
 1st Stage Volta a Catalunya
2005
 1st Stage Critérium International
2006
 1st  Madison (with Joan Llaneras), UCI Track World Championships
 1st Trofeo Mallorca
 1st Trofeo Alcudia
 1st Stage Four Days of Dunkirk

Notes

References

External links 
 
 
 
 
 

1975 births
2006 deaths
Spanish male cyclists
Cyclists who died while racing
Cyclists at the 2000 Summer Olympics
Olympic cyclists of Spain
Sport deaths in Belgium
People from Vilanova i la Geltrú
Sportspeople from the Province of Barcelona
UCI Track Cycling World Champions (men)
Spanish track cyclists
Cyclists from Catalonia
20th-century Spanish people
21st-century Spanish people